Deudorix odana, the indigo playboy, is a butterfly in the family Lycaenidae. The species was first described by Hamilton Herbert Druce in 1887. It is found in Senegal, Guinea, Sierra Leone, Ivory Coast, Ghana, Nigeria (south and the Cross River loop), Cameroon, the Republic of the Congo, the Central African Republic, the Democratic Republic of the Congo (Uele, Tshopo, Sankuru and Lualaba), Uganda, western Kenya and north-western Tanzania. The habitat consists of primary forests.

Adults feed from flowers and both sexes mud-puddle.

The larvae feed on Canavalia ensiformis and Caesalpinia species. They feed on the seeds of their host plant within the pods.

References

External links

Die Gross-Schmetterlinge der Erde 13: Die Afrikanischen Tagfalter. Plate XIII 68 a

Butterflies described in 1887
Deudorigini
Taxa named by Hamilton Herbert Druce
Butterflies of Africa
Deudorix